Oelsnitz is a town in the Vogtlandkreis district, in Saxony, Germany.

Nearby villages
Zaulsdorf

References 

Towns in Saxony
Vogtlandkreis